Anna Linnea Södahl (born 17 September 1987), also known as simply Nea, is a Swedish singer and songwriter.

Early life and education
Södahl was born in South Africa to Swedish parents. Her parents were residing in South Africa as missionaries for the Church of Sweden, but also performed undercover missions supporting efforts to combat apartheid. When Södahl was three years old, the family returned to Sweden, where she was raised in Alingsås. Södahl returned to South Africa as a teenager, working as a volunteer for three months at an orphanage and writing music with the non-profit organization Star For Life.

Södahl studied songwriting and producing at Musikmakarna in Örnsköldsvik, graduating in 2015.

Music career 
As a songwriter Nea has been using her real name, Linnea Södahl, and has written songs for Zara Larsson, Tove Styrke, Tinie Tempah, Felix Jaehn, Twice and Axwell, among others. Her songs have received a total of almost two billion streams worldwide on Spotify. One of her most famous songs, Lush Life, which became an international hit and the most played song in Sweden during the summer of 2015, has sold ten times platinum in Sweden and platinum in the UK and US. As for Swedish artists, Södahl has, in addition to Zara Larsson, Axwell and Tove Styrke, also written songs for Linnea Henriksson, Sabina Ddumba, Skott, Kasbo and Shy Martin.

On 22 December 2019, Nea was placed number one as a singer and number three as a songwriter on Svensktoppen with the songs "Some Say" (which interpolates Eiffel 65's "Blue (Da Ba Dee)") and "Fira jul med mig" (performed by Linnea Henriksson). Other Swedish artists she has written for are Sabina Ddumba, Skott, Kasbo and SHY Martin.

On September 6, 2019, Södahl released her first own song as an artist under the artist name Nea. The debut single "Some Say" was released through Milkshake Label (Sony Music Sweden) and became a major international hit and the 13th most played song on European radio in 2020. In Sweden, the song was on Svensktoppen for 57 weeks.  On January 10, 2020, a remix of "Some Say" made by German DJ Felix Jaehn was released.

On June 12, 2020, Nea released her debut EP "Some Say EP" which in addition to "Some Say" also included the singles "Dedicated", "TG4M" and "Drunk Enough To".

Nea performed at the Spanish music festival Los40 Music Award in 2020 and received to nominations, where she won in the category "Best international dance".

Discography

Extended plays

Singles

As lead artist

As featured artist

Notes

Awards

References

21st-century Swedish women singers
1986 births
Living people
Swedish expatriates in South Africa
English-language singers from Sweden
People from Alingsås